Applying line voltage across  a pickled cucumber causes it to glow. A moist pickle contains salt as a result of the pickling process, which allows it to conduct electricity. Sodium (or other) ions within the pickle emit light as a result of atomic electron transitions, although it is not clear why the luminescence occurs at one end of the pickle.

The glowing pickle is used to demonstrate ionic conduction and atomic emission in chemistry classes, and also as a demonstration in lighting classes.

The first known fully documented demonstration was in a 1989 report from Digital Equipment Corporation. Although this was published as a full technical note and written up as a scientific paper, the publication date, April Fools' Day of that year, gives some indication as to the light-hearted nature of the document.

References

Chemistry classroom experiments
Electron states
Light sources